Westport is an unincorporated community in Carroll County, Tennessee, United States. Its Zip Code is 38387.

Notes

Unincorporated communities in Carroll County, Tennessee
Unincorporated communities in Tennessee